The 2008 World Karate Championships are the 19th edition of the World Karate Championships, and were held in Tokyo, Japan from November 13 to November 16, 2008.

Medalists

Men

Women

Medal table

Participating nations 
888 athletes from 97 nations competed.

 (4)
 (7)
 (5)
 (4)
 (11)
 (10)
 (8)
 (3)
 (10)
 (2)
 (5)
 (14)
 (19)
 (10)
 (16)
 (3)
 (13)
 (11)
 (11)
 (7)
 (12)
 (26)
 (10)
 (16)
 (4)
 (3)
 (16)
 (3)
 (15)
 (6)
 (2)
 (5)
 (23)
 (1)
 (22)
 (14)
 (20)
 (5)
 (2)
 (8)
 (7)
 (16)
 (2)
 (4)
 (16)
 (19)
 (4)
 (14)
 (11)
 (1)
 (13)
 (11)
 (1)
 (13)
 (5)
 (15)
 (2)
 (4)
 (5)
 (8)
 (1)
 (9)
 (1)
 (1)
 (1)
 (5)
 (4)
 (3)
 (10)
 (8)
 (6)
 (11)
 (21)
 (9)
 (8)
 (11)
 (18)
 (3)
 (16)
 (9)
 (18)
 (15)
 (20)
 (9)
 (10)
 (5)
 (1)
 (3)
 (10)
 (24)
 (6)
 (19)
 (1)
 (9)
 (13)
 (11)
 (2)

References

External links
 World Karate Federation
 Official Website
 Karate Records – World Championship 2008
 Day 1–2 resultsDay 3 resultsDay 4 results

World Championships
World Karate Championships
World Karate Championships
Karate competitions in Japan
Karate Championships
2008 in Tokyo
November 2008 sports events in Asia